Jalan Hospital Serdang, Federal Route 345, is an institutional facilities federal road in Selangor, Malaysia. It is a main route to Serdang Hospital from the South Klang Valley Expressway (SKVE) and acts as an emergency route to the hospital.

The Kilometre Zero is located at the Serdang Hospital (West)-SKVE interchange.

At most sections, the Federal Route 345 was built under the JKR R5 road standard, with a speed limit of 90 km/h.

List of junctions

References

Malaysian Federal Roads